Holly Hill Woodland Park is a   Local Nature Reserve in Fareham in Hampshire. It is owned by Fareham Borough Council and managed by the Countryside Ranger Service.

The park has landscaped areas with lakes, waterfalls, islands and woods with exotic trees and flowers, as well as native trees such as oaks. There is also a less formal area of ancient semi-natural woodland.

References

Local Nature Reserves in Hampshire